Xymenopsis tcherniai is a species of sea snail, a marine gastropod mollusk in the family Muricidae, the murex snails or rock snails.

Description

Distribution
This marine species occurs off the Adelie Coast, Antarctica.

References

 Gaillard J.M. (1954). Mission du Batiment Polaire "Commandant Charcot". Récoltes faites en Terre Adélie (1950) par M. Paul Tchernia. III. Mollusques. Bulletin du Muséum National d'Histoire Naturelle. ser. 2, 26(6): 678–684.

Gastropods described in 1954
Xymenopsis